The figure skating competitions at the 2017 Southeast Asian Games in Kuala Lumpur were held at Empire City in Selangor.

The 2017 Games feature competitions in two events, men's and ladies' singles.

Competition schedule

Men 
Short program

Free skating

Overall

Ladies 
Short program

Free skating

Overall

Participation

Participating nations

Medal summary

Medal table

Medalists

References

External links
  

2017
2017 Southeast Asian Games events
Southeast Asian Games